Suite Três Rios is a jazz / world music album by Dan Costa. Recorded in Rio de Janeiro, the album features legendary Brazilian artists such as Jaques Morelenbaum, Marcos Suzano and Leila Pinheiro, and was mixed by Jan Erik Kongshaug. It was considered one of the best of 2016 by DownBeat.

Reception

"Costa's melodic sensibility shines throughout", according to DownBeat critic Carlo Wolff, who considered the album 'finely crafted' and "an entrancing homage to Brazil". All About Jazz critic Paul Naser says: "Brazilian jazz, like its American counterpart, has fondly remembered its roots as it unabashedly moves forward".

Track listing

 Alba (featuring Jaques Morelenbaum)
 Chorinho
 Samba
 Bossa Nova (featuring Leila Pinheiro)
 Baião (featuring Marcos Suzano)
 Maracatu
 Modinha (featuring Teco Cardoso)
 Aria

Personnel

Piano, compositions, arrangements, production - Dan Costa
Guitar, executive co-production - Ricardo Silveira
Alto & tenor sax - Marcelo Martins
Trombone - Vittor Santos
Double bass - Alberto Continentino
Drums - Rafael Barata
Cello - Jaques Morelenbaum
Voice - Leila Pinheiro
Percussion - Marcos Suzano
Baritone sax - Teco Cardoso

Awards
The album won a Global Music Award in 2016.

References

2016 albums